Vakhtang the Good (1738 or 1742 – 1 February, 1756 or 1760) was a Georgian royal prince (batonishvili) of the Bagrationi dynasty. He was the first child and the eldest son of Heraclius II, then-prince of Kakheti, born of his first marriage to Ketevan née Orbeliani or, according to more recent research, Ketevan née Pkheidze.

Vakhtang was born at the time when eastern Georgia was reconquered by the resurgent ruler of  Iran Nader Shah from the Ottoman Empire and the native monarchies in both eastern Georgian kingdoms, Kartli and Kakheti, were still dormant. In 1744, Nader Shah recognized Heraclius and his father Teimuraz II as kings of Kakheti and Kartli, respectively. Thereby, Vakhtang became heir apparent to the throne of Kakheti. Furthermore, in 1747, Vakhtang was bestowed by his grandfather Teimuraz II with the fief of Aragvi, the hereditary duke (eristavi) of which, Bezhan, was murdered by the rebellious peasants in 1743. Henceforth, the duchy of Aragvi passed in possession of the royal family. As Vakhtang was still a minor, the duchy was run on his behalf by Prince Jimsher Cholokashvili, who had to deal with a peasant revolt and Dagestani inroads. Later, after Vakhtang's untimely death of smallpox in Tbilisi, Aragvi was granted to his half-brother, Levan.

Vakhtang was married to Ketevan (20 February 1744–4 March 1808), daughter of Constantine III, Prince of Mukhrani. They had no children. Princess Ketevan lived to see the demise of the Georgian kingdom at the hand of the Russian Empire in 1801 and died in St. Petersburg in 1808.

Ancestry

References

1730s births
1750s deaths
Bagrationi dynasty of the Kingdom of Kartli-Kakheti
18th-century people from Georgia (country)
Deaths from smallpox